Prunay-le-Temple is a commune in the Yvelines department in the Île-de-France region in north-central France. Its area covers about 2.6 square miles on the plateau of Mantois. The altitude is generally between 100 and 130 meters, sloping slightly towards North.

See also
Communes of the Yvelines department

References

Communes of Yvelines